Glencar–Manorhamilton GAA is a Gaelic football, hurling and ladies' Gaelic football club based in Manorhamilton and the Glencar valley, County Leitrim, Ireland. The hurling team play under the name Cluainín Iomáint (Manorhamilton Hurling).

History

The club was founded in 1968; it was predated by the St Patrick's, Manorhamilton Gaelic football club and the Cluainín Uí Ruairc hurling club.

They were based at The Bee Park in Manorhamilton from 1988. They moved to their current grounds in Boggaun in 2017.

Honours
Leitrim Senior Football Championship (7): 1977, 1999, 2008, 2009, 2010, 2011, 2019
Leitrim Intermediate Football Championship (3): 1971, 2005, 2013
Leitrim Junior Football Championship (4): 1958, 1970, 1982, 1999	
Leitrim Senior Hurling Championship (3): 2012, 2013, 2016, 2021

References

External links
 Official website

Gaelic games clubs in County Leitrim
Gaelic football clubs in County Leitrim
Manorhamilton